Stephani Anne Sherlock (born 2 September 1996 in Moscow, Russia) is a British individual rhythmic gymnast who has represented England and Great Britain at international competitions.

Personal life 
Born to a Russian mother and an English father, Sherlock took up rhythmic gymnastics at age 10 in her native Russia, and first joined Esprit Gymnastics club at age 13 in 2009. Stephani's first British championships was in 2010 and then based on selection event in early 2011 she was selected for British national team and started representing Great Britain internationally. She speaks fluent Russian and English. She studied at school in Moscow and graduated with a Red Diploma in 2014. She enrolled at the Lesgaft National State University of Physical Education, Sport and Health in St.Petersburg in 2015.

After her second Commonwealth Games in Gold Coast 2018 she has finished her career as a professional rhythmic gymnast.

, Sherlock is studying a degree in Sports Communication and Marketing at St Mary's University, Twickenham in London.

Career highlights 
Sherlock won her first English championships as a junior in 2011 and became British Ribbon Junior champion the same year. She won the English championships and British Hoop, Ball, Clubs and Ribbon Senior titles in 2013. Sherlock represented England at the 2014 Commonwealth Games where they finished 4th in the Team event, and she qualified to the all-around final (10th) and came 7th in the hoop and ball finals. She won Silver in the all-around British championships in 2015 and became Ribbon British champion 2015.

Sherlock represented Great Britain at the 2014 World Championships in Izmir and at the 2015 World Championships in Stuttgart. She won five golds and became English Champion on 3 July 2016. On 8–10 July Sherlock finished 32nd in the all-around at the 2016 Kazan World Cup. She won the Senior All-around Championships 2016 on 29–30 July 2016 at the British Championships in Liverpool. She also took the Gold in the Ball final at the same event.

In the 2017 season, Sherlock competed at the 2017 Moscow Grand Prix finishing 22nd in the all-around. From 5 to 7 May she competed at the 2017 Sofia World Cup and finished 39th in the all-around. Sherlock finished 32nd in the all-around at the 2017 Berlin World Challenge Cup held from 7 to 9 July. From 19 to 21 May Sherlock, along with teammate Laura Halford, represented the individual seniors for Great Britain at the 2017 European Championships.

References

External links 
 
 
 
 

1996 births
Living people
British rhythmic gymnasts
English gymnasts
Commonwealth Games competitors for England
Gymnasts at the 2014 Commonwealth Games
British people of Russian descent
Gymnasts from Moscow
21st-century British women